Chickasaw Township is one of twelve townships in Chickasaw County, Iowa, USA.  As of the 2000 census, its population was 784.

History
Chickasaw Township was organized in 1855.

Geography
According to the USGS, it contains three cemeteries: Cedar View, Rowley Hill and Saint Boniface.

The stream of Beaver Creek runs through this township.

Notes

References
 USGS Geographic Names Information System (GNIS)

External links
 US-Counties.com
 City-Data.com

Townships in Chickasaw County, Iowa
Townships in Iowa